The Town of Cheraw is a Statutory Town located in Otero County, Colorado, United States.  The town population was 237 at the 2020 United States Census.

History
In 1917, Cheraw was the smallest town in the world with a regimental band.  Cheraw had a population of 80, half of whom were men serving in the Colorado National Guard Second Regiment Band under the leadership of Sergeant Luther D. Armstrong, attached to the regiment of General Cameron and the 115th Ammunition Train commanded by Colonel Danks.

In 1920, the U.S. census of the town of Cheraw reported a population of 186 in 49 households within the town limits.  Fewer than ten of the town's adults had been born in Colorado; most were from the Midwest.  The largest demographic group, 15 percent of the population, were resident aliens who had immigrated from Mexico within the previous decade.

The men's occupations in 1920 included blacksmith, salesman, publisher, lumberyard manager, retail merchant, laborer, wagon driver, bank cashier, barber, physician, druggist, teacher, minister, carpenter, farmer and farm laborers, alfalfa mill manager and laborers, bank bookkeeper, railroad depot operator, [illegible] at pool hall, railroad laborer, and auto mechanic.  Women were employed at paying occupations as saleslady, teacher, manager of the telephone exchange, postal workers, and postmistress. The census taker was also a woman.

Geography
Cheraw is located at  (38.107901, -103.511137).

At the 2020 United States Census, the town had a total area of  including  of water.

Demographics

As of the census of 2000, there were 211 people, 92 households, and 58 families residing in the town. The racial makeup of the town was 95.73% White, 0.95% Native American, 2.84% from other races, and 0.47% from two or more races. Hispanic or Latino of any race were 10.90% of the population.

There were 92 households, out of which 33.7% had children under the age of 18 living with them, 46.7% were married couples living together, 8.7% had a female householder with no husband present, and 35.9% were non-families. 31.5% of all households were made up of individuals, and 7.6% had someone living alone who was 65 years of age or older.  The average household size was 2.29 and the average family size was 2.92.

In the town, the population was spread out, with 24.2% under the age of 18, 10.4% from 18 to 24, 24.6% from 25 to 44, 29.9% from 45 to 64, and 10.9% who were 65 years of age or older.  The median age was 40 years. For every 100 females, there were 90.1 males.  For every 100 females age 18 and over, there were 97.5 males.

The median income for a household in the town was $21,250, and the median income for a family was $24,844. Males had a median income of $20,125 versus $23,750 for females. The per capita income for the town was $12,590.  About 13.4% of families and 14.2% of the population were below the poverty line, including 16.7% of those under the age of eighteen and 8.6% of those 65 or over.

See also

 List of municipalities in Colorado

References

External links

 CDOT map of the Town of Cheraw

Towns in Otero County, Colorado
Towns in Colorado